The Dorenweerd College (formerly Duno College) is a school in the Forests of Doorwerth in the Dutch province Gelderland. 

Education in Dutch and English is offered on 3 levels. The College was founded in 1999 in a merging of several institutes within the City of Renkum. The College has 89 teachers (2013) and 1'144 students (2014). The current Rector is Ms. Gabri Maessen.

Notable students
Marianne Thieme (born 1972), politician and vegetarian

External links
Dorenweerd College

Buildings and structures in Renkum
Educational organisations based in the Netherlands
Schools in the Netherlands
Educational institutions established in 1999
1999 establishments in the Netherlands